Seosan Baseball Training Center is a baseball park and accompanying facilities of Hanwha Eagles in Seosan, South Korea, opened in November, 2012. Located in Seosan Techno Valley area, the training center has one full-scale ballpark with 1,500 seating capacity for second-string team matches, smaller training fields and rehabilitation facilities. It serves as home for the second-string team of Hanwha Eagles and rehabilitation center for injured players.

References 

Baseball venues in South Korea
Buildings and structures in South Chungcheong Province
Hanwha Eagles
Seosan
Sports venues completed in 2012
2012 establishments in South Korea